Wright's Regiment of Militia also known as the 5th Hampshire County Militia Regiment was called up at Northfield, Massachusetts on September 22, 1777, as reinforcements for the Continental Army during the Saratoga Campaign. The regiment marched quickly to join the gathering forces of General Horatio Gates as he faced British General John Burgoyne in northern New York. The regiment served in General Nixon's brigade. With the surrender of Burgoyne's Army on October 17, the regiment was disbanded on October 18, 1777.

Massachusetts militia